This is a list of equipment used by the Chilean Air Force (FACH), the branch of the Chilean Armed Forces that specializes in aerial warfare.

Equipment

Satellite system

Aircraft

Aircraft main armaments

Air defense systems

Vehicles

Infantry weapons

See also
 List of current equipment of the Chilean Army
 List of active ships of the Chilean Navy
 List of current equipment of the Chilean Marine Corps

References

Chilean Air Force
List
Current equipment